Heteropodagrion is a genus of flatwings in the damselfly order Zygoptera, family Heteragrionidae. There are five described species in Heteropodagrion.

Species
 Heteropodagrion croizati Peréz-Gutierrez & Montes-Fontalvo, 2011
 Heteropodagrion nigripes Daigle, 2014
 Heteropodagrion sanguinipes Selys, 1895
 Heteropodagrion superbum Ris, 1918
 Heteropodagrion varipes Daigle, 2014

References

Zygoptera genera
Taxa named by Edmond de Sélys Longchamps